Wolfgang Scharf (born 13 November 1959) is a German speed skater. He competed in three events at the 1984 Winter Olympics.

References

1959 births
Living people
German male speed skaters
Olympic speed skaters of West Germany
Speed skaters at the 1984 Winter Olympics
Sportspeople from Munich